Myriocin, also known as antibiotic ISP-1 and thermozymocidin, is a non-proteinogenic amino acid derived from certain thermophilic fungi. 

Myriocin is a very potent inhibitor of serine palmitoyltransferase, the first step in sphingosine biosynthesis. Due to this property, it is used in biochemical research as a tool for depleting cells of sphingolipids.

Myriocin was shown to inhibit the proliferation of an IL-2-dependent mouse cytotoxic T cell line.

Myriocin possesses immunosuppressant activity. It is reported to be 10- to 100-fold more potent than ciclosporin.

The multiple sclerosis drug fingolimod was derived from myriocin by using structure–activity relationship studies to determine the parts of the molecule important to its activity.

References

Antibiotics
Amino acids
Beta hydroxy acids
Vicinal diols